Challis is a surname. Notable people with the surname include:

 Alva Challis (1930–2010), Welsh-born New Zealand geologist
 Christopher Challis (1919–2012), British cinematographer
 Ellie Challis (born 2004), British Paralympic swimmer
 George Challis (rugby league), Australian rugby player
 Gordon Challis (1932–2018), New Zealand poet
 James Challis, British clergyman and astronomer
 John Challis (1942–2021), English actor
 John Henry Challis, Anglo-Australian merchant and philanthropist

See also
Chalis, surname